Hannah Hofman (born 10 November 1981) is a Dutch woman cricketer. She made her international debut at the 2013 ICC Women's World Twenty20 Qualifier.

References

External links 
 
Profile at CricHQ

1981 births
Living people
Dutch women cricketers
Netherlands women Twenty20 International cricketers
Sportspeople from Rotterdam